During the 1995–96 English football season, Tranmere Rovers F.C. competed in the Football League First Division.

Season summary
In the 1995–96 season, Tranmere made a great start, winning eight of their first 16 league games and by 22 November sat in 3rd place and four points of the top and automatic promotion seemed to be on course but afterwards Tranmere went on a horrendous run of form and on 12 April 1996 which saw Tranmere near the relegation zone after only four wins from 24 league games since 22 November, chairman Frank Corfe appointed John Aldridge as player-manager, and King was "moved upstairs" to become Director of football. They finished a disappointing campaign in 13th place.

Final league table

Results
Tranmere Rovers' score comes first

Legend

Football League First Division

FA Cup

League Cup

Squad

References

Tranmere Rovers F.C. seasons
Tranmere Rovers